China University of Labor Relations, previously known as China Institute of Industrial Relations and abbreviated as CIIR, is a university in Beijing, China. It is the only public college under the direction of All-China Federation of Trade Unions.

Formerly called China Institute of Workers' Movement, CIIR originated from the Cadre School for All-China Federation of Trade Unions established in 1946 and was upgraded to a regular college for undergraduate education with the approval of the Ministry of Education of China. With over 6 decades’ history, it is a multi-disciplinary college with distinctive features covering economics, management, law study, literature, engineering and art.

History 
The college history began in the year 1946 with the establishment of the School of Administrative Cadres at Shanxi-Chahar-Hebei Border Area and later became China Institute of Labour Movement offering continuing education to trade unions and the society. After years of explorations and hard work, CILM had developed into a nationally influential institute for higher adult education.  Till May 2003, under the influence of China's newly established socialist market economy mechanism, CILM was renamed as China Institute of Industrial Relations and upgraded into a regular undergraduate college to meet the new requirements of the developing domestic labor movement for high-level professionals. In 2016, the university's English name was changed to China University of Labor Relations.

Schools and departments 
Majors for undergraduate education include labor relations, labor and social insurance, safety engineering, financial management, human resource management, administrative management (on administrative culture building for entrepreneurs and public institutions), business administration, hotel management, economics, politics and administration science, journalism, Chinese language and literature, drama and film-television literature, etc. In December 2012, officially approved by the Academic Degree Committee of the State Council of China, CIIR started the pilot professional master's degree education, with MPA being authorized professional degree. In 2013, CIIR began to recruit graduate students.

Teaching organizations include:
 Department of Labor Relations
 Department of Economic Management
 Department of Public Management
 Department of Safety Engineering
 Law School
 Trade Union School
 School of Cultural Communication
 School of Cadre Training
 School of Advanced Vocational Education
 School of Continuing Education

Research 
CIIR has a great number of senior experts in the fields of trade union theory, labour and employment, industrial relations, labour law, social security legislation, basic labour theory and labour market. Within a long period of time, It has gradually put in place a unique research structure in trade union and labour sciences. There are 10 institutes, such as the Industrial Relations Institute, Enterprise Development Institute, Labour Study Institute, Labour Market Institute and Culture and Communication Institute. They stand in the forefront in the academic excellence in the fields of trade union study, history of workers' movement, industrial relations theory, labour law, labour economics and social security in China. They have undertaken and completed a number of state- and province-or-ministry-level research projects, participated in ACFTU's work and labour legislation, offered theoretical supports for government departments in their making policies on trade unions, labour and social security and provided trade unions, local labour departments and business with policy consulting and management formula. The Journal of China Institute of Industrial Relations is rated as one of the core Chinese political journals and one of the core social journals in China.

Campus 
 Beijing campus: No.45, Zengguang Road, Haidian District, Beijing.
It is located in the urban area of Beijing besides the West 3rd Ring Road. The nearest subway station is Baishiqiao South Station of Subway Line and Line.
 Zhuozhou campus: Zhuolai Road, Zhuozhou, Hebei Province.
It is located in the western suburb area of Zhuozhou, Hebei Province.

Notable people 
 Li Lisan, the first president of CIIR
 Gao Yuanyuan, film actress, graduated in 2002 with a certificate in public relations
 Jiang Rong (Lü Jiamin), former associate professor, author of best-selling novel Wolf Totem

References

External links 
 

Universities and colleges in Beijing
Labor studies organizations
Educational institutions established in 1946
1946 establishments in China